South Side Mall is an enclosed shopping mall in South Williamson, Kentucky, on U.S. Route 119. Anchor stores are Sears Hometown Store, Label Shopper, Shoe Show Mega Store, and Tractor Supply Company. The mall is also home to South Side Theater.

History
David Hocker and Richard E. Jacobs group developed the mall in 1980 located in Kentucky but largely serving Williamson, West Virginia. Original tenants included Kroger/SuperX Drugstore, Kmart, and R. H. Hobbs department store. Dawahares was also an anchor store. By 1983, R. H. Hobbs had closed and been converted to Watson's, which in turn was sold to Peebles in 1998. The Kmart, later the site of Magic Mart, closed in 2002. Dawahares is now Shoe Show.

Magic Mart announced that it would close the South Side Mall store in mid-2016.

On March 3, 2020, Peebles was converted into Gordmans, which in turn was closed in July 2020, following the filings of bankruptcy from the company.

References

Buildings and structures in Pike County, Kentucky
Shopping malls in Kentucky
Shopping malls established in 1981